Dhalkebar is a neighborhood or town in Mithila Municipal Area. Previously it was a separate village development committee in Dhanusa District. At the time of the 1991 Nepal census it had a population of 7,797 persons living in 1374 individual households.

On 02 December 2014 Mithila Municipality was declared merging Dhalkebar VDC ,Begadawar VDC,Naktajhij VDC with it.

References

External links
UN map of the municipalities of Dhanusa District

Populated places in Dhanusha District